Rock 'n' Roll with the Modern Lovers  is the second album by American rock band Jonathan Richman and the Modern Lovers, released by Beserkley Records in 1977.

The album reached No. 50 in the UK Albums Chart. The song "Egyptian Reggae" was a hit in Europe.

Critical reception
Dave Marsh, in The New Rolling Stone Record Guide, wrote that Richman "lost his vision and became once more a teenage twerp ... Now you know why everybody picked on that kid in high school." Greil Marcus, in The Village Voice, called the album "the purest rock and roll album I've heard this year, rooted as it is in the idea that as long as you keep a good beat, rock and roll is what you can get away with." Trouser Press wrote: "Mixing traditional folk songs and lullabies with originals that would do Mister Rogers proud ('Ice Cream Man,' 'Rockin' Rockin' Leprechaun'), the ironically titled album stretched the ability of his adult fans to join in the fun."

Track listing
All tracks composed by Jonathan Richman, except where noted.

Side one
"Sweeping Wind (Kwa Ti Feng)" (traditional) – 1:59
"Ice Cream Man" – 3:01
"Rockin' Rockin' Leprechauns" – 2:09
"Summer Morning" – 3:49
"Afternoon" – 2:45
"Fly into the Mystery" – 3:19

Side two
"South American Folk Song" (traditional) – 2:34
"Roller Coaster by the Sea" – 2:05
"Dodge Veg-O-Matic" – 3:45
"Egyptian Reggae" – 2:34
"Coomyah" (Desmond Dekker) – 2:08
"Wheels on the Bus" (traditional) – 2:26
"Angels Watching over Me" (traditional) – 1:50

2004 CD bonus track
"Dodge Veg-O-Matic (Extended Version)" – 4:12

Personnel
Jonathan Richman and the Modern Lovers
Jonathan Richman – vocals, guitars
Greg 'Curly' Keranen – bass, vocals
Leroy Radcliffe – guitar, vocals
D. Sharpe – drums, vocals

Technical
Matthew King Kaufman – producer
Glen Kolotkin – producer
Carol Fondé – photography
William Snyder – painting
Tom Lubin – assistant engineer
Phil Brown – mastering
Flashing Neon – LP concept
Jim Blodgett – art direction
Billy Cole – logistics

References

1977 albums
Jonathan Richman albums
Beserkley Records albums
Albums produced by Glen Kolotkin